Out of the Everywhere is a collection of seventeen scientific essays written by American writer and scientist Isaac Asimov and originally published in The Magazine of Fantasy and Science Fiction. The title comes from the opening lines of George Macdonald's poem "Baby": 
"Where did you come from, baby dear?"
"Out of the everywhere into here."

Contents 
Part I: Astronomy
The Very Error of the Moon (October 1987)
Asking the Right Question (November 1987)
Out of the Everywhere (November 1988)
Into the Here (December 1988)
Part II: Humanity
The Road to Humanity (December 1987)
Standing Tall (January 1988)
The Longest River (July 1988)
Is Anyone Listening (June 1988)
Part III: Radiation
The Unrecognized Danger (February 1988)
The Radiation That Wasn't (March 1988)
 Part IV: Magnetism
Iron, Cold Iron (April 1988)
From Pole to Pole (May 1988)
Part V: Fuel
The Fire of Life (August 1988)
The Slave of the Lamp (September 1988)
The Horse Under the Hood (October 1988)
Part VI: Time
The Unforgiving Minute (January 1989)
Part VII: Something Extra
A Sacred Poet (September 1987)

References

External links
Asimovonline.com

Essay collections by Isaac Asimov
1990 non-fiction books
Works originally published in The Magazine of Fantasy & Science Fiction
Doubleday (publisher) books
Scientific essays